Wilhelm Meyerhoffer (13 September 1864 – 21 April 1906) was a German chemist.

Meyerhoffer studied chemistry and worked with Jacobus Henricus van 't Hoff  at the University of Amsterdam and the 
University of Berlin.

The mineral Meyerhofferite is named after him.

References

1864 births
1906 deaths
19th-century German chemists